Kim Dong-han (born July 3, 1998), also known mononymously as Donghan, is a South Korean singer, songwriter and actor. He first became known for competing in the reality survival show Produce 101 Season 2, and later debuted in the boy band JBJ. Kim made his solo debut with the release of his EP D-Day in June 2018. He is currently a member of South Korean boy band WEi.

Early life
Kim was born on July 3, 1998, and was raised in Daegu, South Korea.

Career

2017–2018: Produce 101 and JBJ

Kim first became known in mid-2017, while competing in the reality survival show Produce 101 Season 2, a show designed to form a temporary boy group of 11 members, chosen by the public. Kim was eventually eliminated, finishing in 29th place and failing to become a member of Wanna One.

On the day of the Produce 101 finale, viewers of the show voted for eliminated contestants who they'd like to see in a project group, similar to Produce 101'''s I.B.I. JBJ debuted in October 2017 with the release of their first extended play Fantasy. The group released two EPs and a special album during their seven-month career. Members of the group had expressed interest in extending their original contact, however the group ultimately disbanded at the end of April 2018 with the expiration of their contract.

2018–2019: Solo debut with D-Day and solo activities
Kim made his debut as a solo artist on June 19, 2018, with the release of his first EP D-Day, and its lead single "Sunset". The EP entered the Gaon Album Chart at number five. A week after debuted, on June 26, 2018, he scored his first music show win on SBS MTV's The Show.

Kim's second EP, titled D-Night, was released on October 17, 2018, with the lead single "Good Night Kiss".

A year later, on May 1, 2019, Kim released his third EP D-Hours AM 7:03, with the lead single "Focus".

On August 28, 2019, Kim made an appearance on I Can See Your Voice Thailand as a special artist. The following month, on September 17, 2019, Kim became a cast member on Law of the Jungle in Sunda Islands.

2020—present: Continued solo success and debut with Wei
On January 26, Kim debuted as a theater actor on "Iron Mask", a musical theater based on The Man in the Iron Mask movie, alongside Sandeul and his fellow JBJ groupmate, Roh Tae-hyun.

On June 25, 2020, Oui Entertainment announced that Kim will be one of the main casts for a TikTok X tvN D Story's web series, Trap, which will be aired starting on July 15, 2020. This series is also remarked his debut as an actor.

After announcing that they will be debuting a new boy group, which Kim will be part of, back on June 17, on July 10, 2020, Oui Entertainment launched social media accounts for the group, which will be called "위아이" or "WEi". The group debuted on October 5, 2020, with their first EP, Identity: First Sight'', with "Twilight" as the lead single.

Personal life
April 10, 2020, Kim underwent a tonsillectomy on after experiencing discomfort in his tonsils, even after several continuous medical treatment at the hospital. He spent the following three-to-four weeks recovering from the surgery.

Discography

Extended plays

Singles

As lead artist

Other releases

Songwriting 
All song credits are adapted from the Korea Music Copyright Association's database, unless otherwise noted.

Filmography

Web series

Television shows

Web shows

Hosting

Musical theaters

Concerts

Kim Dong Han Seoul Concert "Day & Night" (2019)

Kim Dong Han Concert "D-NATION" (2020)

Awards and nominations

Notes

References

External links

 Kim's profile at Oui Entertainment 

1998 births
Living people
WEi members
Kakao M artists
Produce 101 contestants
South Korean male idols
21st-century South Korean male  singers
People from Daegu